Burrow is a surname. Notable people with the surname include:

Andrew Burrow (born 1963), South African tennis player
Bob Burrow (1934–2019), American basketball player
Curtis Burrow, American football player
Edward Burrow (priest) (1785–1861), English divine
James Burrow (1701–1782), English legal reporter
Jim Burrow (born 1953), American football player and coach
Joe Burrow (born 1996), son of Jim; American football quarterback
Jordan Burrow (born 1992), English footballer
J. W. Burrow (1935–2009), English historian
Kathleen Mary Burrow (1899-1987), Australian physiotherapist, businesswoman and Catholic lay leader
Ken Burrow (born 1948), American football player
Milton Burrow (1920–2017), American sound editor
Reuben Burrow  (1747–1792), English mathematician, surveyor and Orientalist
Rob Burrow (born 1982), English rugby league player
Rube Burrow (1855–1890), American outlaw
Sharan Burrow (born 1954), Australian trade unionist
Stephen Burrow (born 1958), English cricketer
Taj Burrow (born 1978), Australian surfer
Thomas Burrow (1909–1986), English Indologist and professor of Sanskrit at Oxford
Trigant Burrow (1875–1950), American psychoanalyst, psychiatrist and psychologist

See also
Burrough, surname
Burrows (surname)